Rodney Figueroa (born 13 July 1966) is a Puerto Rican wrestler. He competed in the men's freestyle 130 kg at the 1992 Summer Olympics.

He currently serves as the District Administrator for the School District of Monroe, in Monroe, Wisconsin.

References

External links
 

1966 births
Living people
Puerto Rican male sport wrestlers
Olympic wrestlers of Puerto Rico
Wrestlers at the 1992 Summer Olympics
Place of birth missing (living people)